Skirda is a Russian surname. The male and female forms are the same.

Notable people with this surname include:
 Alexandre Skirda (born 1942), French anarchist
 Mikhail Skirda (ru) (1904-1979), Soviet general
 Ilia Skirda (born 2002), Russian figure skater